Lombardy refers to the administrative region in northern Italy.

It may also refer to:

57th Infantry Division Lombardia, and infantry division of the Royal Italian Army during World War II
Lombardy (historical region), the historical region encompassing the modern region and some of the neighbouring territories
Lombardy (wine), the wine region in northern Italy
Lombardy, Mississippi, a village in the United States
Lombardy, Ontario, a village in Canada